Hinterland   in the original Welsh language version  is a Welsh noir police procedural series broadcast on S4C in Welsh. The main character, DCI Tom Mathias, is played by Richard Harrington. On 27 November 2013, a second series was announced by S4C. The English-language version, with brief passages of Welsh dialogue, aired on BBC One Wales. When it was shown on the BBC in 2014, it was the first BBC television drama with dialogue in both English and Welsh. A third series of the show began filming in January 2016 and debuted on S4C on 30 October.

The programme is set in Aberystwyth, Ceredigion, Wales, and the three series were filmed in and around the town, often in rural locations.

The critical reaction to “Hinterland- Y Gwyll"” was favourable. Wales Arts Review wrote: “Y Gwyll has been shot with real intelligence; simple, subtle and with both eyes focussed on the feeding of the atmospheric cloud over the piece.”

“Hinterland-Y Gwyll” went on to be shown in 150 countries.

Production
The series reflects the commitment made in April 2013 by the Director of BBC Cymru Wales, Rhodri Talfan Davies, to show more Welsh language, life, and culture on the mainstream BBC channels.

On a tight budgetfunds that took two and a half years to raisethe total production cost was £4.2 million. The programme-makers received £215,000 in repayable business funding from the Welsh Government, and the first series was mainly filmed in Aberystwyth and the surrounding county of Ceredigion on the west coast of Wales, over a 124‑day period in 2013. The show was filmed in both Welsh and English, with the location-based production offices contained within the former Ceredigion Council offices Swyddfa'r Sir, which also acts as the exterior of the show's police station.

Each scene was filmed twice, in the English and Welsh languages, apart from a few scenes where Welsh with subtitles is used for the English version.

The Welsh version was broadcast (in eight parts) on S4C in October 2013, with the bilingual version (in four parts) broadcast on BBC One Wales in January 2014 and on BBC Four later that year. Danmarks Radio (DR), acquired the rights in 2012 to broadcast the show in Denmark, before filming had commenced.

Cast
Richard Harrington as Detective Chief Inspector Tom Mathias
Mali Harries as Detective Inspector Mared Rhys
Alex Harries as Detective Constable Lloyd Elis
Hannah Daniel as Detective Sergeant Siân Owens
Aneirin Hughes as Chief Superintendent Brian Prosser

Main cast

Episodes

Series overview

Series 1 (2013)

Series 2 (2015)

Series 3 (2016)

Home Video

United States: Region 1 NTSC-DVD in English with English Subtitles 
Acorn Home Video released SERIES 1 on 1 July 2014, but no further series releases until Acorn-TV released the COMPLETE SERIES on 16 November 2021

United Kingdom: Region 2 PAL-DVD in English & Welsh with English Subtitles on the Welsh version only (currently out of print)
Arrow Films released SERIES 1 on 26 May 2014; SERIES 2 on 30 May 2016; SERIES 3 and the TRILOGY COMPLETE SERIES on 29 May 2017

Netherlands: Region 0 PAL-DVD in English with Dutch Subtitles; Region A,B,C, Blu-ray with both English and Welsh versions, subtitles are in Dutch only (currently out of print)
Just Bridge Entertainment released "SERIE 1" on 21 October 2014; "SERIE 2" on 24 January 2017; "SERIE 1-3" in 2018

Germany: The series is re-titled "Inspector Mathias - Mord in Wales" Region 2 PAL-DVD & regions A,B,C, Blu-ray Language & Subtitles in German & English
Polyband/WVG released "Staffel" 1 on 9 August 2015, "Staffel" 2 on 5 September 2016
("Staffel" 3 was never released, nor a compete "Staffel")

Australia: Region 4 PAL-DVD (currently out of print)
Acorn Home Video released SERIES 1 in 2014; SERIES 2 on 6 July 2016; SERIES 3 and the TRILOGY COMPLETE SERIES 1-3 on 7 June 2017

References

External links
 
 Y Gwyll
 
 

2010s Welsh television series
2013 British television series debuts
2016 British television series endings
2010s British police procedural television series
BBC Cymru Wales television shows
British detective television series
Welsh-language television shows
English-language television shows
S4C original programming
Television shows set in Wales
Tinopolis
BBC television dramas